Albert Raymond Walker (1881-1958) was an American architect. He is primarily known for his work with Percy A. Eisen as Walker & Eisen in Los Angeles.

Biography

Early life
Albert Raymond Walker was born on May 9, 1881, in Sonoma, California. His parents were Albert Walker, an immigrant from Norway, and Elizabeth Stevens, who was born in New York. They married around 1880 and lived in Sonoma, where Albert Walker worked in a tin-plate factory. The finding aid at the Online Archive of California states he graduated from Brown University, but does not list when.

Early career

Albert Walker died prematurely during or before 1900, and Elizabeth moved with 19-year-old Albert Raymond Walker to San Diego. From 1901 to 1904, Albert Raymond Walker worked as a draftsman for the San Diego firm of William S. Hebbard and Irving Gill, where he made the drawings for the George W. Marston House. In 1906, Walker moved from San Diego to Los Angeles to work for architects in that city. He worked as a draftsman for John Parkinson and George Bergstrom, as a designer for Myron Hunt and Elmer Grey, and as a designer for Alfred Rosenheim.

In 1908, he started his own firm, in an office in the Homer Laughlin Building. During this time, he designed the Fullerton First Methodist Episcopal Church, which was listed on the National Register of Historic Places in 2001. In 1910, he formed a partnership with the architect John Terrell Vawter. Their projects included the Frank C. Hill House at 201 South Coronado Street in Echo Park, built in 1911, and the original building of the Bible Institute of Los Angeles (now Biola University), which was damaged in the 1987 Whittier Narrows earthquake and demolished the following year. In 1916, their firm was registered at an office in the Continental Building, where Walker continued to work after their partnership dissolved in 1916. Walker worked alone from 1917 to 1918, and started a partnership with Percy A. Eisen in 1919 that lasted for over twenty years.

Walker & Eisen

He designed the First National Bank of Fullerton in Fullerton, California, the Grible Store Building in Montrose, California, the Edward Strasburg House in Pasadena, California, and the City Hall and Police Station in Upland, California.

Together with Percy A. Eisen (1885-1946), he designed the Alameda Theater, the Hotel Normandie, the Ambassador Hotel, the Beverly Wilshire Hotel at the bottom of Rodeo Drive in Beverly Hills, California,  the Fine Arts Building, the Four Star Theater, the Humphreys Avenue School, the Walter G. McCarty Office Building and Hotel Project, the Mid-Wilshire Office Building, the National Bank of Commerce, the James Oviatt Building, the Plaza Hotel, the South Basin Oil Company Store and Office Building, the Sunkist Building, the Taft Building, the Texaco Office Building, the Title Insurance and Trust Company Building, the United Artists Theatre, the Santa Monica Clock Tower the Chamber of Mines and Oil Building, the Ardmore Apartments, the Wilshire Royale Apartments, and the Bay City Guaranty Building and Loan Association in Santa Monica, California.

Outside Los Angeles, they also designed the Empire Theater in Long Beach, California, the Public Library in Torrance, California, the  United Artists Pasadena Theatre in Pasadena, California, the United Artists Theater in El Centro, California, the Breakers Hotel in Long Beach, California, El Mirador Hotel in Palm Springs, California, and the El Cortez Hotel in San Diego, California. They also built the Valley National Bank Building, the oldest skyscraper in Tucson, Arizona, in 1929.

Together with Gus Kalionzes and Charles A. Klingerman, he designed the Saint Sophia Cathedral, Los Angeles in 1948.

Death
He died on September 17, 1958, in Los Angeles.

References

1881 births
1958 deaths
Architects from Los Angeles
Brown University alumni
20th-century American architects
People from Sonoma, California